"Baggage" is the 22nd episode of the seventh season of the American sitcom Everybody Loves Raymond (1996–2005). The series follows the life of Newsday sportswriter Ray Barone as he tries to cope with being with his neurotic family, consisting of wife Debra (Patricia Heaton), parents Frank (Peter Boyle) and Marie (Doris Roberts), brother Robert (Brad Garrett), daughter Ally (Madylin Sweeten), and twin sons Michael 
(Sullivan Sweeten) and Geoffrey (Sawyer Sweeten). The episode aired on May 5, 2003 on CBS. The episode was written by Tucker Cawley and directed by Gary Halvorson.

Production 
"Baggage" was written by Tucker Cawley based on a real-life argument he had with his wife about an empty suitcase.

Reception 
"Baggage" has been named by critics one of the best episodes of Everybody Loves Raymond, the number-one best by The Oregonian; and was number six on a ranking by TV Guide of the 65 Best Episode of the 21st Century. It is the fifth highest-rated episode of Everybody Loves Raymond on IMDb as of October 2019, with a rating of 8.7; and in a March 2005 online viewers poll ran by CBS of top Raymond episodes, "Baggage" was number three. As Screen Rant summarized "Baggage," "as simple as [its] premise is, it created a lot of comedic moments. It proved that the show had strongly-written characters because even with not much to do, their solid personalities and quirks took over, causing fans to fall in love with the humor."

Awards 
Cawley won two awards for writing "Baggage," including a Primetime Emmy Award for Outstanding Writing for a Comedy Series and a similar award from the Online Film & Television Association's TV Awards. Heaton was also nominated for a Primetime Emmy for Outstanding Lead Actress in a Comedy Series for acting in the episode.

References 

2003 American television episodes
Everybody Loves Raymond episodes